The Sierra Tontal tuco-tuco (Ctenomys tulduco) is a species of rodent in the family Ctenomyidae. It is known only from a small locality in the Sierra del Tontal, San Juan Province, west central Argentina.

References

Tuco-tucos
Mammals of Argentina
Mammals of the Andes
Mammals described in 1921
Taxa named by Oldfield Thomas